Central Bontok (or Kali) is a language of the Bontoc group from the Philippines. The 2007 census claimed there were 19,600 speakers.

Distribution 
Ethnologue reports the following locations for Central Bontok:

Cordillera Administrative Region: Mountain Province: Bontoc municipality, Bontoc ili, Caluttit, Dalican, Guina-ang, Ma-init, Maligcong, Samoki, and Tocucan villages.

Dialects 
Ethnologue reports 5 dialects for Central Bontok: Khinina-ang, Finontok, Sinamoki, Jinallik, Minaligkhong and Tinokukan.

Similarities 
Ethnologue reports that the language is similar to other Bontoc languages, These languages are: North Bontok, Southwest Bontok, South Bontok, and East Bontok.

Phonology

Consonants
The Guinaang dialect of Central Bontok has the following inventory of consonant phonemes:

With the introduction of loanwords from English, Ilokano and Tagalog, these contrasts have become phonemicized. The phoneme  was also introduced in modern loanwords.

References

See also 
 Philippine languages

 
Languages of Mountain Province
South–Central Cordilleran languages